Synaptomys is a genus of North American lemmings.  These animals live in wet forested and open areas. They are small, cylindrical rodents with large heads and short ears, legs, and tails. They eat green vegetation such as grasses and sedges. They are often found in colonies.

Systematics
The genus Synaptomys comprises two extant species and 10 extinct species.

Extant species
 Northern bog lemming (S. borealis Richardson, 1828)  
 Southern bog lemming (S. cooperi Baird 1858)

Extinct species
 Florida bog lemming (S. australis Simpson 1928)
 Bunker's bog lemming (S. bunkeri Hibbard 1939)
 Morgan's bog lemming (S. morgani Martin et al. 2003)

A number of other fossil species have been included here but have since been transferred to other genera, such as Mictomys and Praesynaptomys.

References

Further reading
 

Synaptomys
Taxa named by Spencer Fullerton Baird